Central Village is a shopping, leisure, commercial and residential development that is currently under construction in Liverpool, England, United Kingdom. The complex is being built over Liverpool Central railway station, the UK's busiest underground station outside London. The core of the project is two high rise blocks of 25 and 20 floors linked by a 9-storey residential and commercial podium and two nine and five storey buildings for residential, hotel and commercial use. The development is by Merepark and is predicted to cost roughly £160 million. It is one of a number of ambitious projects to take place in Liverpool city centre in the early 21st century - other developments being Liverpool One, King's Dock, Prince's Dock, Lime Street Gateway, Metquarter and developments in the Commercial District. The proposed development includes the famous Lewis's department store building. Besides the residential, commercial and leisure aspects of the development, there will also be a number of office buildings and a large QPARK multi-storey car park - which will be the first part of Central Village to be completed in 2011. Planning permission was granted for the project by Liverpool City Council in May 2009, and final approval was given for construction of the entire complex to commence in February 2010. The entire Central Village scheme was due for completion in 2015 however is still to be completed due to a series of delays.

Project timeline

 June 2006 - Planning permission is obtained for the development.
 October 2006 - The largely run-down site on which Central Village will be built is acquired by Merepark.
 October 2006 - In the same month as site acquisition, funding for the project is received.
 Early 2007 - Projected start date for construction, however some decisions were pending and more focus was given to the L1 development; it was delayed for a number of years.
 May 2008 - Permission is granted to build the Copthorne Hotel Liverpool within Central Village.
 October 2008 - Permission is granted to create the Millennium Hotel Liverpool in the former Watson building.
 November 2009 - To accompany the redevelopment of Central Station, money is pledged to improve and expand overall facilities within.
 February 2010 - Lewis's department store announces it will not renew the lease on the advice of Merepark.
 May 2010 - First contract awarded to McGee to design and build a £7 million 459-space car park which will become the first phase of construction in the summer of 2010.
 May 2010 - Lewis's closes its doors after 154 years of trading, after its parent Vergo Retail went into administration.
 March 2013 - Apart-hotel Adagio opens.

Liquidation
 June 2013 - Merepark Construction enters voluntary liquidation in June 2013 bringing development work to a halt.
 2014 - Budget supermarket Lidl announce they plan to open a store in the Lewis's Building.
 January 2017 - Augur Liverpool take over the lease of part of the site.
 May 2017 - Lidl announce they have shelved their plans for a supermarket on the site.
 September 2017 - Augur announce plans to develop the Lewis's building into a shopping and leisure destination, to be called 'Circus'.
 May 2018 - Liverpool City Council announce plans to buy the shopping centre above Liverpool Central Railway Station and simultaneously lease it back to Augur.
 September 2018 - Augur complete the work to convert the remainder of the Lewis's building into offices in a development known as 'The Department'.

Central Station redevelopment

Although not the largest in Liverpool city centre, Central Station proved the busiest in the 2008/2009 period when close to 20 million passengers passed through the station in the space of a year. In December 2007, Bart Schmeink, Merseyrail's then managing director, pledged a major overhaul of Liverpool's Loop Line underground stations. As it stands the redevelopment of Central Station is now one of the most important aspects of the Central Village scheme. In 2009 the station was identified as one of the ten worst category B interchange stations for mystery shopper assessment of fabric and environment, and is set to receive a share of £50m funding for improvements. Alongside the surface level redevelopment of Central Station (which connects it directly to the main Central Village plaza via escalators), on 23 April 2012 Liverpool Central closed its doors to passengers to undergo a major refurbishment and makeover of the station at a cost of £20m which was fully completed in October 2012.

Hotels
In January 2009 hoteliers Millennium & Copthorne announced that they would be opening two hotels in Central Village (a hotel chain that is primarily aimed at corporate guests and leisure customers). The three or four-star Copthorne Hotel Liverpool was to face onto Newington Square, whilst the four or five-star de luxe Millennium Hotel were to be created in the refurbished Grade II listed Watson Building near the Lewis's building. This plan did not come to fruition and with problems with the developer the hotel chain pulled out of the development to be replaced with a proposed Moxy Hotel (Marriott and Ikea). These plans also fell through. In 2013, an apart hotel, Adagio opened at Central Village.

Lewis's redevelopment

The  nine-storey Lewis's building, which was Liverpool's most famous store for 154 years, closed its doors for the last time on 29 May 2010 and will be redeveloped as part of the Central Village project. Lewis's is the only currently standing building that will house retail outlets of Central Village in the near future. Large amounts of office space and a 125-room Adagio hotel will occupy the remaining floors.
In September 2017, new owners Augur announced they planned to develop the former Lewis's building into a mixed retail and leisure development known as 'Circus'. Augur stated they had been in discussions with Network Rail and Liverpool City Council so that any developments on the site would leave space for any future expansion of Liverpool Central station. Augur hope to submit planning permission in 2018 with building work potentially starting later on in the year.

See also
 Lewis's
 Liverpool One

References

External links
 Merepark property development
 Central Village Liverpool
 Central Village at Liverpoolwiki
 Lewis's Department Store

Central Village
Proposed buildings and structures in Liverpool